Scarred for Life is the debut album by Californian melodic hardcore band Ignite.

Track listing
 Automatic (3:16)
 Slow (2:01)
 Where They Talk (2:12)
 Shade (3:10)
 Turn (2:15)
 Ash Return (3:47)
 Should Have Known (3:30)
 Scarred for Life (4:55)

Credits
 Brett Rasmussen — Bass
 Casey Jones — Drums
 Joe D. Foster — Guitar
 Joe Nelson — vocals on tracks 6 to 8
 Randy Johnson — vocals on tracks 1 to 5
 Bob Moon — Engineer

References
 
 

1994 debut albums
Ignite (band) albums